Miss Venezuela 1983 was 30th Miss Venezuela pageant, was held in Caraballeda, Vargas state, Venezuela, on May 5, 1983, after weeks of events.  The winner of the pageant was Paola Ruggeri, Miss Portuguesa.

The pageant was broadcast live on Venevision from the Macuto Sheraton Hotel in Caraballeda, Vargas state. At the conclusion of the final night of competition, outgoing titleholder Ana Teresa Oropeza, crowned Paola Ruggeri of Portuguesa as the new Miss Venezuela. The pageant telecast was also part of the network preparations for its broadcast of the 1983 Pan American Games in Caracas later in the year, with Joaquin Rivera acting as executive producer of both the opening and closing ceremonies. For this, a special number was done during the pageant promoting the multisport event.

Results
Miss Venezuela 1983 - Paola Ruggeri (Miss Portuguesa)

The runners-up were:
1st runner-up - Carolina Cerruti (Miss Apure)
2nd runner-up - Donna Bottone (Miss Miranda)
3rd runner-up - Isabel Yépez (Miss Amazonas)
4th runner-up - Helene Chemaly (Miss Distrito Federal)
5th runner-up - Marina Rueda (Miss Monagas)
6th runner-up - Dalia Linares (Miss Lara)
7th runner-up - Laura García (Miss Barinas)

Special awards
 Miss Photogenic (voted by press reporters) - Marbellyz Roa (Miss Guárico)
 Miss Congeniality - Reina Venturini (Miss Falcón)
 Miss Elegance - Adriana Novellino (Miss Táchira)
 Miss Amistad - Paulina Parada (Miss Mérida)
 Miss National Press - Carolina Cerruti (Miss Apure)

Delegates
The Miss Venezuela 1983 delegates are:

 Miss Amazonas - Isabel Teresa Yépez
 Miss Anzoátegui - Millarca (Mila) Márquez Chaumier
 Miss Apure - Carolina Cerruti Duijm
 Miss Aragua - Julie Miralles
 Miss Barinas - Laura García Flores
 Miss Bolívar - Yadira Caraballo
 Miss Carabobo - Maria Eugenia Larrain
 Miss Delta Amacuro - Vera Fawzy Sayed†
 Miss Departamento Vargas - Josefina Durán Longa
 Miss Distrito Federal - Helene Chemaly Abudei†
  Miss Falcón - Reina Venturini Madrigal
 Miss Guárico - Marbellyz Roa Cermeño
 Miss Lara - Dalia Di Filippo Linares
 Miss Mérida - Paulina Parada Sandrock
 Miss Miranda - Donnatella Tiranti Bottone
 Miss Monagas - Marina Rueda Menero
 Miss Nueva Esparta - Evelyn Luján
 Miss Portuguesa - Paola Ruggeri Ghigo
 Miss Sucre - Ana Sayeg
 Miss Táchira - Adriana Novellino Blonval
 Miss Yaracuy - Gisel Arrivillaga
 Miss Zulia - Susana Cavazza Castellano

External links
Miss Venezuela official website

1983 beauty pageants
1983 in Venezuela